Dennis Oppenheim (September 6, 1938 – January 21, 2011) was an American conceptual artist, performance artist, earth artist, sculptor and photographer. Dennis Oppenheim's early artistic practice is an epistemological questioning about the nature of art, the making of art and the definition of art: a meta-art that arose when strategies of the Minimalists were expanded to focus on site and context. As well as an aesthetic agenda, the work progressed from perceptions of the physical properties of the gallery to the social and political context, largely taking the form of permanent public sculpture in the last two decades of a highly prolific career, whose diversity could exasperate his critics.

Biography and Education
Oppenheim's father was a Russian immigrant and his mother a native of California. Oppenheim was born in Electric City, Washington, while his father was working as an engineer  on the Grand Coulee Dam. Soon after, his family returned to their home in the San Francisco Bay area. Oppenheim attended Richmond High school.

He later attended the California College of Arts and Crafts, where he met his first wife, Karen Marie Cackett. Oppenheim and Cackett moved to Honolulu, where he taught at the University of Hawaii and they had their first child, Kristin, in 1959. In 1962  they had their second child, Erik. In 1964, he earned a Bachelor of Fine Arts degree from the California College of Arts and Crafts in Oakland and an MFA from Stanford University in Palo Alto in 1965. He moved to New York in 1966 and taught art at a nursery school in Northport and a junior high school in Smithtown, Long Island, while working toward his first one-person New York show in 1968 when he was 30 years old. His third child, Chandra, was born to Phyllis Jalbert that year.

In 1981 he married the sculptor Alice Aycock who remained a close friend. In 1998 he married Amy Plumb and they remained married.  Oppenheim occupied a live-work loft in Tribeca from 1967 until his death from cancer on January 21, 2011, aged 72.

Work

Conceptual works:
Executed in New York, Paris and Amsterdam and documented in photography, the series Indentations (1968)  consisted of the removal of objects, exposing the impression of each object at that location. Viewing Stations (1967) were built as platforms for observing land vistas, suggesting an embodied notion of vision. The artist presents the base as the art itself, a viewer becomes an object to be looked at, a conceptual reversal.

Earthworks:
Social systems were overlaid on natural systems in Oppenheim's earthworks. In Annual Rings (1968) the schemata of lines depicting the annual growth of a tree was mapped by plowing snow on opposite sides of St. John's River, the boundary of the US and Canada. The earthwork relates geo-political boundaries, time zones, growth of the tree and entropic decay in a seminal site-specific work.

Body – performance works:
Oppenheim's body art grew out of his awareness of his own body when executing earthworks. In these works, the artist's body was both the subject and the object, providing the opportunity to work on a surface not exterior to the self, giving total control over the artwork. These body art actions were later assimilated into the canon of performance art. For Reading Position for Second Degree Burn (1970) Oppenheim lay on a beach for five hours with an open book on his chest, exposing himself to the sun. Oppenheim describes the piece as a corporeal enactment of painting, going on to state "I could feel the act of becoming red.".

Genetic works:
A series of works were made in collaboration with Oppenheim's children, whom he saw as extensions of himself. In a diptych titled 2- Stage Transfer Drawing. (Advancing to a Future State)., he makes a drawing on a wall at the same time that his son attempts to replicate the drawing on his father's back, a procedure reversed in 2- Stage Transfer Drawing. (Returning to a Past State). (1971) when he replicates the drawing on his son's back. Recorded in still photography, film and videotape,  the performances were first exhibited as floor-to ceiling loop film projections. He also collaborated with his first wife in Forming Sounds (1972) and referred to his father, David Oppenheim, in the works Polarties (1972) and Identity Transfer (1970).

Film / video installations:
Oppenheim began to produce installation art in the early seventies. These works were often autobiographical. In Recall  (1974), a video monitor is an installation component, positioned in front of a pan of turpentine. The monitor shows a close up of Oppenheim's mouth as he verbalizes a stream-of-consciousness monologue induced by the smell, on his experiences in art school in the fifties.

Post-performance- biographical works:
In a series of eight works Oppenheim called "post-performance," the artist spoke through his surrogate performance figures  about the end of the avant-garde, his own art-making, in dialogue as opposites or as in Theme for a Major Hit (1974) acted under motorized control to a rock song with his lyrics, "It ain’t what you do, it’s what makes you do it," recorded by a band of Soho artists. Reflecting the underlying content of the post-modern, it is an "analysis of its own origins" with an "awareness of its vulnerability."

Machineworks:
In the early eighties, room size sculptural installations took the form of factories and machines to visualize the genesis of an artwork before it becomes form. Final Stroke- Project for a Glass Factory (1981) analogized thinking patterns as moving parts. Vacuum cleaners and powered heaters activated raw material through sieves, troughs, stacks and vents, as the stages of processing in the production of ideas. The machines became projection structures for fireworks, producing thought lines in the air, as in Newton Discovering Gravity (1984).

Sculpture:
While he continues to use sound, light and motion in the sculptural work in the late eighties, the imagery includes ordinary objects in different scales or as a collision of objects. In several works, animals appear. A group of taxidermy deer produce flames from the tips of their antlers, in Digestion. Gypsum Gypsies. (1989).

Public Sculpture:
Oppenheim experimented with titled and cantilevered form in Device to Root Out Evil (1997). Included as part of the Venice Biennale, it uses hand blown Venetian glass on the country church's roof and steeple.  In 1999,  a version using translucent corrugated fiberglass was installed as a permanent work in Palma de Mallorca. In the commissioned public work that followed,  Oppenheim integrated the function of the building or the site in the work itself. Jump and Twist (1999) is an industrial, anthropologic work in three parts;  on the plaza, through the facade of the building and suspended from the atrium's ceiling as translucent rotating form. The public work Light Chamber (2011) at the Justice Center in Denver, is an open room with translucent walls derived from the petals of many flowers.

See also
 Engagement (sculpture)
 Radiant Fountains, Houston, Texas
 Formula compound, Fattoria di Celle- Collezione Gori, Pistoia

Further reading
 Oppenheim, Dennis, Flower Arrangement for Bruce Nauman, Multiples, Inc., New York, 1970.
 Glusberg, Christian, Nine Days with Dennis Oppenheim, El Centro de Arte y Comunicación, Buenos Aires, 1971.
 Fels, Mathias, Dennis Oppenheim, 1967-1971, Paris, 1972.
 Pluchart, Francois, Dennis Oppenheim 1967-1971, Mathias Felds and Editions CEDIC, Paris, 1972.
 Oppenheim, Dennis, Dennis Oppenheim, Stedelijk Museum, Amsterdam, 1974.
 Oppenheim, Dennis, Indentations, Gallerie Yaki Kornblit, Amsterdam, 1974.
 Van Tieghem, Jean-Pierre, Dennis Oppenheim, Palais des Beaux-Arts, Brussels, 1975.
 Oppenheim, Dennis, Dennis Oppenheim Proposals 1967-1974, Lebeer-Hossman, Brussels, 1975.
 Parent, Alain (ed.), Dennis Oppenheim: Retrospective - Works 1967-1977, Musee d’Art Contemporain, Montreal, 1978.
 Ammann, Jean-Christophe, Dennis Oppenheim, Kunsthalle Basel, Basel, 1979.
 Weyl, Dr. Martin, Dennis Oppenheim, The Israel Museum, Jerusalem, 1979.
 Institute of Contemporary Art, Machineworks, Institute of Contemporary Art, Philadelphia, 1981.
 Teicher, Hendel and Poser, Steven,  Dennis Oppenheim, Galerie Eric Franck, Geneva, 1981.
 Fox, Howard N., Metaphor, Smithsonian Institution Press, Washington D.C., 1982.
 Guralnik, Nehema, Factories, Fireworks, 1979-1989, The Tel Aviv Museum, Tel Aviv, 1984.
 Joyaux, Alain G., Dennis Oppenheim: Accelerator for Evil Thoughts, Ball State University Art Gallery, Muncie, 1985.
 Collins, Tricia and Milazzo, Richard, Dennis Oppenheim Recent Works, Liverpool Gallery, Brussels, 1990.
 Kolokotronis, Yannis and Reid, Calvin, Dennis Oppenheim Retrospective 1970-1990, Pierides Museum of Contemporary Art,  Athens, 1990.
 G. Roger Denson, "A Poesy of Diagnostics or the Object-Neurology of Dennis Oppenheim", Parkett 33, Zurich, New York, 1992.
 Rose, Barbara, Parallel Realities: The Drawings of Dennis Oppenheim, La Difference, Paris, 1992.
 Levin, Kim and Spooner, Peter F., Dennis Oppenheim Drawings and Selected Sculpture, University Galleries, Illinois State                           University, Normal, 1992.
 Heiss, Alanna and McEvilley, Thomas, Dennis Oppenheim: Selected Works 1967-90, Harry N. Abrams Inc., New York, 1992.
 Miralles, Francesc, Dennis Oppenheim: Recent Works, Sala d’Exposicions del Govern d’Andorra, Andorra, 1993.
 Bassas, Assumpta; Denson, G. Roger and Mercader, Antoni, Dennis Oppenheim: Obra 1967-1994, Ajuntament de Barcelona, Barcelona, 1994.
 Gandini, Manuela and Bradley, Kim Dennis Oppenheim, Ierimonti Gallery, Milan, 1995.
 Coppola, Regina, In vivo, University Gallery, University of Massachusetts, Amherst, MA, 1996.
 Eccles, Tom, Dennis Oppenheim Land Art 1968-78, Vestsjaellands Kunstmuseum, Soro, 1996.
 Stather, Martin, Recent Sculpture and Large Scale Project Proposals, Mannheimer Kunstverein, Mannheim, 1996.
 Celant, Germano, Dennis Oppenheim (Venezia Contemporaneo), Edizioni Charta, Milan, 1997.
 Denson, G. Roger and de Almeida, Bernardo Pinto, Dennis Oppenheim, Fundacao De Serralves, Porto, 1997.
 Celant, Germano (ed.), Dennis Oppenheim: Explorations, Edizioni Charta, Milan, 2001.
 Tayler, Simon, Dennis Oppenheim: New Works, Guild Hall Museum, East Hampton, 2001.
 Deming, Diane and Heartney, Eleanor, Dennis Oppenheim: Galloping through the West, Nevada Museum of Art, Reno, 2003.
 Borras, Maria Lluisa, Dennis Oppenheim De l'art a camp obert a l'art urba Centre de Cultura Sa Nostra, Palma de Mallorca,  2003.
 Demetrio Paparoni, Dennis Oppenheim: Project Drawings, In Arco Books, Torino, 2005.
 Bertoni, Mario, Dennis Oppenheim Poetics of Touch, Edizione APM, Modena, 2005.
 Bedarida, Raffaele and Montrasio, Ruggeo, Dennis Oppenheim Short Circuit, Silvana Editoriale, Milan, 2007.
 O'Brien, Glenn, My Mind is My House, Edelman Arts, New York, 2008.
 Levy, Aaron; Acconci, Vito and Betsky, Aaron, Public Projects Charta, Milan, 2009.
 Fiz, Alberto and Garbagna, Cristina, Splashbuilding, Mondadori Electra, Milan, 2009.
 Beatrice, L., Dennis Oppenheim Projects Drawings and Sculptures, Gallerie d'Arte Orler, Venice, 2010.
 Fiz, Alberto and Hegyi, Lóránd, Dennis Oppenheim Silvana Editoriale, Milan, 2011.
 Deho, Valerio, Dennis Oppenheim Electric City, Kunst Merano Arte, Merano, 2012.
 Gray, Anna and Mascotte, Matthew Dennis, Dennis Oppenheim Alternative Land Art, Savannah College of Art and Design, Atlanta, 2012.
 Haines, Cheryl, 1968: Earthworks & Ground Systems, Haines Gallery, San Francisco, 2012.
 Tassinari, Valeria, Dennis Oppenheim Large Drawings, Museo Mago’900, Cambi, 2014.
 Lawrence, Nora R. Dennis Oppenheim: Terrestrial Studio, Storm King Art Center, New Windsor, 2016.
 Kaye, Nick and Oppenheim, Amy, Dennis Oppenheim: Body to Performance'', Skira, Milan, 2017.

References

External links

 
 Dennis Oppenheim in ArtCyclopedia
 Interview with Dennis Oppenheim
 The Performance Art of Dennis Oppenheim
 Guggenheim Fellowship
 "Dennis Oppenheim, 1938-2011: The Man Who Made The World Nervous", Huffington Post
 Dennis Oppenheim obituary, The Guardian
 Exhibit of Oppenheim's works at Wright State University
 Based on a True Story: Highlights from the di Rosa Collection

1938 births
2011 deaths
American people of Russian-Jewish descent
American printmakers
American photographers
California College of the Arts alumni
Stanford University alumni
Deaths from cancer in New York (state)
Deaths from liver cancer
Sculptors from New York (state)
Sculptors from Washington (state)
People from Grant County, Washington